Sõmerpalu Parish was a rural municipality of Estonia, in Võru County. It had a population of 1,771 (as of 1 January 2016) and an area of 181.93 km².

Settlements
Small borough
Sõmerpalu
Villages
Alakülä - Alapõdra - Haava - Haidaku - Haamaste - Hänike - Hargi - Heeska - Horma - Hutita - Järvere - Kahro - Kärgula - Keema - Kurenurme - Lakovitsa - Leiso - Liiva - Lilli-Anne - Linnamäe - Mäekülä - Majala - Mustassaare - Mustja - Osula - Pritsi - Pulli - Punakülä - Rauskapalu - Rummi - Sõmerpalu - Sulbi - Udsali - Varese

Images

See also
Nursipalu training area

References

External links
 

Former municipalities of Estonia